The Stars Look Very Different Today  is the 11th album by bassist Ben Allison. It was released on Allison's own Sonic Camera label on December 3, 2013.

Track list
All compositions by Ben Allison.

 D.A.V.E. (Digital Awareness Vector Emulator)
 Dr. Zaius
 The Ballad of Joe Buck
 Neutron Star
 No Other Side
 Kick It, Man
 Swiss Cheese D
 Improvisus

Personnel
 Ben Allison – acoustic bass
 Brandon Seabrook – guitar, banjo
 Steve Cardenas – guitar
 Allison Miller – drums

References

2013 albums
Ben Allison albums